The tenement at 86 Gdanska street is a historical habitation building located at 86 Gdanska Street, in Bydgoszcz, Poland.

Location 
The building stands on the eastern side of Gdańska Street at the intersection with Zamoyskiego street.

It stands close to remarkable tenements in the same street:
 Ernst Bartsch tenement at 79;
 Paul Storz Tenement at 81;
 Villa Carl Grosse at 84;
 Otto Riedl Tenement at 85;
 Tenement at 91 Gdanska street.

History
The house was built in 1887-1888 for wood dealer Hugo Hecht and designed by architect Joseph Święcicki. At the time, the address was 126 Danzigerstrasse.

It opens up a string of six close stylish buildings ordered by Hugo Hecht and built by Joseph Święcicki, all located on the same side of Gdańska street, and produced annually in the 1880s and 1890s.

Immediately after the construction, the house was sold to the superintendent Ludwig Hollweg who installed a wrought iron gate.

Shortly after, the building was bought by Otto Pfefferkorn, manager of a large furniture factory in Bydgoszcz, still active today under the name Bydgoskie Fabryki Mebli S.A..
Otto Pfefferkorn had another building built at 2 Jagiellonska Street in 1912.

From April 1, 1939 till 1945, Kazimierz Orlicz, a Bydgoszcz architect, ran his own design office in this tenement.

Architecture
The house boasts an eclectic facade reminiscing French Renaissance style. 
Putti and sirens stucco reliefs are nicely mounted on decorative plaster and brick and facade.

In the same area, Józef Święcicki also realized other edifices:
 Hotel "Pod Orlem" at 14 Gdańska Street;
 Oskar Ewald Tenement at 30 Gdańska Street;
 Józef Święcicki tenement at 63 Gdańska Street;
 Tenement at 1 Plac Wolności.

Gallery

See also

 Bydgoszcz
 Gdanska Street in Bydgoszcz
 Józef Święcicki

References

External links
  Bydgoskie Fabryki Mebli S.A.

Bibliography 
 

Buildings and structures on Gdańska Street, Bydgoszcz
Buildings by Józef Święcicki
Residential buildings completed in 1888